Ricfried was Bishop of Utrecht between 806 and 815/816.

It is suspected that he was related to his successors Frederick, Alberik II, Ludger and Balderic. Nothing is known about his reign. He was buried in the St. Salvator Church in Utrecht.

Further reading
C. Dekker, Geschiedenis van de provincie Utrecht (Utrecht, 1997)

Bishops of Utrecht
Bishops in the Carolingian Empire
9th-century deaths
Year of birth unknown